Paul Robert Ignatius (born November 11, 1920) is an American government official who served as Secretary of the Navy between 1967 and 1969 and was the Assistant Secretary of Defense during the Lyndon Johnson Administration.

Life and career

Ignatius was born in 1920 in Glendale, California, the son of Armenian parents who migrated to the United States, Elisa (née Jamgochian) and Hovsep "Joseph" B. Ignatius (original last name – Ignatosian). Ignatius' ancestors came from the historic Armenian settlement of Agin near Kharpert. Ignatius is a trustee of the George C. Marshall Foundation and member of the Federal City Council and the Washington Institute of Foreign Affairs. He has served previously as cofounder and chairman of the board of trustees for Logistics Management Institute; chairman, president and CEO of Air Transport Association; president of The Washington Post newspaper and executive vice president of The Washington Post Company; Secretary of the Navy; Assistant Secretary of Defense (Installations and Logistics), Under Secretary of the Army, and Assistant Secretary of the Army (Installations and Logistics).

He founded Harbridge House, Inc., a Boston management consulting and research firm. Ignatius received his bachelor's degree from the University of Southern California (Phi Beta Kappa and Phi Kappa Tau) and his MBA degree from Harvard Business School. He served as a commissioned lieutenant in the U.S. Navy in World War II, principally as an aviation ordnance officer aboard  escort aircraft carrier  in the Pacific. He has two sons and two daughters.  David Ignatius is a columnist for The Washington Post, and a novelist.   Adi Ignatius is editor-in-chief of Harvard Business Review. Both daughters, Sarah and Amy, have practiced law. Amy Ignatius is a Superior Court Judge in New Hampshire. Sarah Ignatius has worked for decades as a non-profit executive director.

Legacy
She was commissioned at Port Everglades, Florida on July 27, 2019.

References

1920 births
Living people
American people of Armenian descent
Harvard Business School alumni
People from Glendale, California
Military personnel from California
United States Secretaries of the Navy
University of Southern California alumni
The Washington Post people
20th-century American naval officers
20th-century American businesspeople
United States Under Secretaries of the Army
Journalists from California
American centenarians
Men centenarians
United States Navy personnel of World War II
United States Navy officers